Behance (stylized as Bēhance) is a social media platform owned by Adobe whose main focus is to showcase and discover creative work. 

Behance was founded by Matias Corea and Scott Belsky in November 2005. It was acquired by Adobe in December 2012. As of October 2020, Behance had over 24 million members.

History 

Behance was founded by Matias Corea and Scott Belsky in November 2005. The company initially relied on revenue, generating income by selling banner ads, job postings and later, 99U conference tickets. In May 2012, their first round of outside funding received $6.5 million from investors including Dave McClure and Jeff Bezos's personal investment firm, Bezos Expeditions.

The company was acquired by Adobe Systems for $150 million in December 2012. In 2021, Behance added a subscription feature for users to sell their tutorials and other services. It also added crypto wallet integration.

Corporate affairs

Products
Users can sign up to Behance and build profiles consisting of projects. Both registered and unregistered users can view any particular project, as well as comment on them. Members of Behance can follow other users' profiles. Co-founder Belsky compared the first version of Behance's online porfolios with "project" structures as providing an organised art showcase, in comparison to DeviantArt and Saatchi's digital community.

Adobe Portfolio 
Adobe Portfolio (formerly ProSite) is Behance's DIY web design application, similar to popular tools such as Weebly and Joomla. It is a personal portfolio side creation tool on the web and it syncs with a users Behance project. Adobe Portfolio can only be accessed by buying an Adobe Creative Cloud subscription

Served sites
Content from the Behance Network gets fed into a network of sites called the Served sites, which display work in specific categories such as fashion, industrial design, and typography. In September 2010, more were added, including branding, digital art and toy design. In April 2012, advertising, art, architecture and more were added as categories.

Action Method
Action Method is a productivity methodology targeting creative professionals. It includes a line of paper products (since 2014 sold by The Ghostly Store rather than Behance itself) and an online application called Action Method Online (although this was discontinued 1 June 2014). Its purpose is to connect every event with a set of specific tasks which the user can perform, called action steps.

99U
99U is a consulting service and annual conference in New York City that focuses on marketing. The name 99U comes from the Thomas Edison quote that "Genius is 1% inspiration, 99% perspiration." In 2011, 99U won a Webby Award for "Best Cultural Blog."

Awards
 2009 Webby Award Finalist (The Behance Network) – Self-Promotion/Portfolio Category
 2009 Silicon Alley Insider Award Finalist – Most Loved Product or Service
 2011 Webby Award Winner (The 99%) – Best Cultural Blog
2017 Webby Award Winner (Behance) – Community

Criticism 
Adobe's acquisition of Behance in 2012 prompted concerns that the company would start monitoring the activity of its users.

See also
 Creative Cloud controversy
 Adobe Systems
 Adweek
 AIGA
 Core77
 D&AD

Notes

References

External links
Official Website

Adobe Inc.
Promotion and marketing communications